Lotte Miller (born 25 January 1996) is a Norwegian triathlete, born in Stavanger. She represented Norway at the 2020 Summer Olympics in Tokyo 2021, competing in triathlon.

In 2015, she competed in the women's event at the 2015 European Games held in Baku, Azerbaijan.

References

External links
 
 
 

 

1996 births
Living people
Sportspeople from Stavanger
Norwegian female triathletes
European Games competitors for Norway
Triathletes at the 2015 European Games
Triathletes at the 2020 Summer Olympics
Olympic triathletes of Norway